Deep cervical may refer to:

Deep cervical artery
Deep cervical fascia
Deep cervical glands
Deep cervical lymph nodes
Deep cervical vein